Calhoun-Gibert House is a historic home located at Willington in McCormick County, South Carolina.  It was built about 1856 and was originally a one-story Greek Revival style dwelling.

About 1908, the home was enlarged to two stories, and it was modified to incorporate Classical Revival design elements. It features a full-width, one-story hipped roof porch and a projecting pedimented portico. Also on the property are a contributing frame garage, a two-story frame cattle barn, a board-and-batten smoke house, a hay barn, and a potato barn.

The house is associated with the Calhoun family, a family of McCormick County planters and businessmen.

It was listed on the National Register of Historic Places in 1996.

References

Houses on the National Register of Historic Places in South Carolina
Greek Revival houses in South Carolina
Neoclassical architecture in South Carolina
Houses completed in 1856
Houses in McCormick County, South Carolina
National Register of Historic Places in McCormick County, South Carolina
1856 establishments in South Carolina